The  was held on 30 December 2022.

Nominations and awards were announced by the organizers on 15 November. This was the first awards ceremony since 2019 to allow attendance at the venue.

Presenters 
 Kasumi Arimura
 Shinichiro Azumi (TBS Announcer)

Winners

Grand Prix
 Sekai no Owari – "Habit"
 Artist: Sekai no Owari
 Lyrics: Fukase
 Music: Nakajin
 Arranger: Sekai no Owari

Excellent Work Awards
 Junretsu - "Kimi wo Ubai Saritai"
 NiziU - "Clap Clap"
 Wacci - "Koidaro"
 Kiyoshi Hikawa – "Koshuji"
 Ado - "New Genesis"
 Da-ice - "Starmine"
 Mrs. Green Apple - "Dance Hall"
 Macaroni Enpitsu - "Nandemo Nai yo,"
 Be:First - "Bye-Good-Bye"
 Sekai no Owari - "Habit"

New Artist Awards
 Hanna Ishikawa
 Ocha Norma
 Aimi Tanaka
 Yuuki Tani

Best Vocal Performance
 Daichi Miura

Special Prize
 Ado
 Aimer
 Otokogumi
 King Gnu
 Kep1er
 Da Pump
 Yuzu

Special Award
 Sayuri Ishikawa
 Yoshimi Tendo
 Yumi Matsutoya

Japan Composer's Association Award
 Fujii Kawai

Special Achievement Award
 Man Arai (lyricist)
 Masao Saiki (composer)
 Teruhiko Saigō (singer, actor)
 Shinichi Sasaki (singer)
 Jirō Shinkawa (singer)
 Naoki Matsudaira (singer)
 Kōji Ryū  (drummer, songwriter)

Special International Music Award
 Seventeen

References

External links 
 

2022
2022 music awards
2022 in Japanese music
Impact of the COVID-19 pandemic on the music industry